Civics of Italy whose official name is Civics of Italy – Us Moderates (UDC – Coraggio Italia – Us with Italy – Italy in the Centre) – MAIE is a centre-right parliamentary group established in the Senate of the Republic of the XIX legislature on 18 October 2022.

History 
Civics of Italy was established on 18 October 2022 as a group in the Senate among the lists that support the center-right coalition majority, which won the 2022 Italian general election on 25 September. The group also includes three members of FdI.

Antonio De Poli was unanimously elected chairman of the group.

Composition

Notes

References

Parliamentary groups